Croydon, an electoral district of the Legislative Assembly in the Australian state of New South Wales was created in 1927 and abolished in 1959.


Election results

Elections in the 1950s

1956

1953

1950

Elections in the 1940s

1947

1944

1941

1940 by-election

Elections in the 1930s

1938

1935

1932

1930

Elections in the 1920s

1927

References

New South Wales state electoral results by district